In mathematics, a Riccati equation in the narrowest sense is any first-order ordinary differential equation that is quadratic in the unknown function. In other words, it is an equation of the form

If  the equation reduces to a Bernoulli equation, while if  the equation becomes a first order linear ordinary differential equation.

The equation is named after Jacopo Riccati (1676–1754).

More generally, the term Riccati equation is used to refer to matrix equations with an analogous quadratic term, which occur in both continuous-time and discrete-time linear-quadratic-Gaussian control.  The steady-state (non-dynamic) version of these is referred to as the algebraic Riccati equation.

Conversion to a second order linear equation 

The non-linear Riccati equation can always be converted to a second order linear ordinary differential equation (ODE):
If

then, wherever  is non-zero and differentiable,  satisfies a Riccati equation of the form

Substituting , it follows that  satisfies the linear 2nd order ODE

since

so that

and hence

A solution of this equation will lead to a solution  of the original Riccati equation.

Application to the Schwarzian equation 

   	
An important application of the Riccati equation is to the 3rd order Schwarzian differential equation

which occurs in the theory of conformal mapping and univalent functions. In this case the ODEs are in the complex domain and differentiation is with respect to a complex variable. (The Schwarzian derivative  has the remarkable property that it is invariant under Möbius transformations, i.e.  whenever  is non-zero.) The function 
satisfies the Riccati equation

By the above  where  is a solution of the linear ODE

Since , integration gives 
for some constant . On the other hand any other independent solution  of the linear ODE
has constant non-zero Wronskian  which can be taken to be  after scaling.
Thus

so that the Schwarzian equation has solution

Obtaining solutions by quadrature 

The correspondence between Riccati equations and second-order linear ODEs has other consequences. For example, if one solution of a 2nd order ODE is known, then it is known that another solution can be obtained by quadrature, i.e., a simple integration. The same holds true for the Riccati equation. In fact, if one particular solution  can be found, the general solution is obtained as

Substituting

in the Riccati equation yields

and since

it follows that

or

which is a Bernoulli equation. The substitution that is needed to solve this Bernoulli equation is

Substituting

directly into the Riccati equation yields the linear equation

A set of solutions to the Riccati equation is then given by

where z is the general solution to the aforementioned linear equation.

See also 
 Linear-quadratic regulator
 Algebraic Riccati equation
 Linear-quadratic-Gaussian control

References

Further reading

External links 
 
 Riccati Equation at EqWorld: The World of Mathematical Equations.
 Riccati Differential Equation at Mathworld
 MATLAB function for solving continuous-time algebraic Riccati equation.
 SciPy has functions for solving the continuous algebraic Riccati equation and the discrete algebraic Riccati equation.

Ordinary differential equations